A status referendum was held on the island of Curaçao on 8 April 2005. The option of becoming an autonomous area within the Kingdom of the Netherlands was approved by 68% of voters.

Background
After the 1993 referendum failed to show support for a separate status for Curaçao, the government of the Netherlands Antilles tried to restructure the Netherlands Antilles and attempted to forge closer ties between the islands, as is exemplified by the adoption of an anthem of the Netherlands Antilles in 2000. A new referendum on Sint Maarten, which was in favour of a separate status for Sint Maarten as a country within the Kingdom of the Netherlands, sparked a new series of referendums across the Netherlands Antilles, however. Curaçao was the last island to vote.

Results

See also
Dissolution of the Netherlands Antilles
2000 Sint Maarten status referendum
2004 Bonaire status referendum
2004 Saban status referendum
2005 Sint Eustatius status referendum

References

Referendums in Curaçao
Referendums in the Netherlands Antilles
Status referendum
Curacao
Independence referendums
Curacao